Hendrik Jebens (born 8 August 1995) is a German professional tennis player who specializes in doubles.

Jebens has a career high ATP doubles ranking of world No. 123, achieved on 27 February 2023. He has won one ATP Challenger doubles title.

Career
He lost the doubles first round qualifying of the ATP 500 event 2022 Swiss Indoors with partner Fabian Fallert in three sets against Nathaniel Lammons and Jackson Withrow.

Doubles performance timeline

ATP Challenger and ITF Futures/World Tennis Tour finals

Doubles: 14 (4–10)

References

External links
 
 

1995 births
Living people
German male tennis players
People from Stuttgart
Sportspeople from Tübingen (region)
Tennis people from Baden-Württemberg
San Diego State Aztecs men's tennis players